Target Nevada was a super-group composed of members from Bird of Ill Omen, Poison the Well, Until the End, All Hell Breaks Loose, Deadweight and Dance Floor Justice.

In 2004, they released their CD single "Something Nasty", which was later followed by a full-length album.

Discography
 The Young Andy Sixkiller Chronicles (2003)
 Something Nasty (2004)
 No, We Don't Want To Play Your Shitty Fest (2004)

References

External links
 Target Nevada on Myspace
 Target Nevada on Surprise Attack Records

Musical groups from Miami
Metalcore musical groups from Florida